The 1924 SMU Mustangs football team was an American football team that represented Southern Methodist University (SMU) as a member of the Southwest Conference (SWC) during the 1924 college football season. In its fifth season under head coach Ray Morrison, the team compiled a 5–1–4 record (2–0–4 against SWC opponents), finished second in the conference, and outscored opponents by a total of 92 to 59. SMU was invited to the Dixie Classic, where they lost to West Virginia Wesleyan.

Schedule

References

SMU
SMU Mustangs football seasons
SMU Mustangs football